Dan Gordon (born 1961) is an actor, director and playwright from Belfast, Northern Ireland.

Early life
Gordon was born in Belfast in 1961, the son of David, a shipyard worker, and Irene. He was educated at Sydenham Infants and Strand Primary (later renamed Victoria Primary) and Sullivan Upper School in Holywood where he developed his interest in acting. He trained as a teacher at Stranmillis University College where he read English and Drama.

Gordon left teaching and worked part-time at the Lyric Theatre in Belfast.

Career
He is best known in Northern Ireland for his portrayal of Red Hand Luke in the BBC Northern Ireland sitcom Give My Head Peace. He starred in the Marie Jones monodrama A Night in November in the Tricycle theatre in London and again in the Lyric Theatre in Belfast. The production played off-Broadway in 1998 and Gordon was nominated for a Broadway Outer Critics Circle Award for outstanding solo performance.

He has also worked in dramas on BBC Radio 3 and 4, and is a columnist for the Belfast newspaper Sunday Life. In 2004 he won BBC Northern Ireland Drama's first ever radio drama competition.

In 2009, he staged a self-written piece about Harland and Wolff Shipyards in Belfast. The play, provisionally titled All the Queen's Men, received its premier in an East Belfast church, known locally as the Shipyard Church.  Now known as The Boat Factory, it toured unusual venues during October 2010. The production played the Edinburgh Festival 2012 and the following year played in New York at the 59E59 Theatre as part of the BRITS OFF BROADWAY JUN 4 - JUN 30, 2013. The production also played at the King's Head Theatre Islington, Theatre Clwyd Mold and Gordon was nominated in the Best Actor category for an Off-West End 'OFFIE' award.

In 2015 Gordon appeared in The God of Carnage (Prime Cut Productions ) at Belfast MAC https://themaclive.com  - The Shadow of a Gunman at The Abbey Theatre Dublin and Christmas Eve Can Kill You by Marie Jones at The Lyric Theatre Belfast. Christmas Eve Can Kill You is the most successful play produced by the Lyric Theatre to date breaking all box office records.

Personal life
He married his wife, Cathy, in November 1984. The couple have three daughters: Sarah, Hannah and Martha.

References

1961 births
Living people
Male television actors from Northern Ireland
Male radio actors from Northern Ireland
Male actors from Belfast